Buchanhaven Hearts Junior Football Club are a Scottish football club, from Peterhead, Aberdeenshire. Members of the Scottish Junior Football Association, they currently play in Scottish Junior Football North Second Division. The club are based at Raemoss Park in the Buchanhaven area of Peterhead and the team colours are maroon.

The original Buchanhaven Hearts side were founded in 1908 and existed as a Junior club until 1946. After several years in abeyance, the club re-formed in 1959 as a Welfare side before re-joining the SJFA in 1971.

Honours
 North Region Division One winners: 2008–09
 North Region Second Division winners: 2018–19
 North East Division One winners: 1979–80, 1991–92
 Archibald Cup: 1991–92
 Duthie (Acorn Heating) Cup: 1988–89, 1991–92
 Morrison Trophy: 1988–89

External links 
Club website
Scottish Football Historical Archive
Non-league Scotland
SJFA Club Directory

Football clubs in Scotland
Scottish Junior Football Association clubs
Association football clubs established in 1908
Sport in Peterhead
1908 establishments in Scotland
Football in Aberdeenshire